John Laporte may refer to:
 John Laporte (politician)
 John Laporte (artist)